Fred Kruger (born Johan Friedrich Carl Kruger, 18 April 1831 – 15 February 1888) was a German-born photographer noted for his early photography of landscape and indigenous peoples in Victoria, Australia.

Migration to Australia from Germany 
Kruger was born of a working-class family on 18 April 1831 at 16 Steingassestrasse, Berlin, Germany, and was baptised Johān Friedrich Carl Krüger. He traded as an upholsterer and in 1858 married Auguste Wilhelmine Elisabeth Bauman at Friedrichwerder Church in Berlin. It is thought that his wife and son migrated to Victoria, Australia on 23 April 1863, some time after his own arrival. He initially joined a partnership in a furniture business that his brother Bernard established at Rutherglen in 1854. Kruger subsequently became the sole owner of the business, but then sold it before 1866, when he set up as cabinetmaker in Taradale.

Photographic career 
Also in 1866, Kruger first registered his photography business at 133 Cardigan Street, Carlton, Melbourne, before moving it in August 1867 to High Street, Prahran, Melbourne, continuing there until 1871, then relocating in Preston to High Street and again to Regent Street in that suburb.

During this period, Kruger was achieving international recognition for his landscape photography, including the award of medals from both the 1872 Vienna Exhibition and the 1876 Philadelphia Centennial Exhibition. He became the first photographer to take group photos of the first Aboriginal cricket team in 1866, which became one of his most recognised images, and was subsequently commissioned in 1877 by the Aboriginal Protection Board to create a collection of work including portraits of the Aboriginal residents of the Coranderrk reserve, an Aboriginal reserve run by the colonial government of  Victoria, which was made public in 1883. Kruger won more awards; a gold medal for the best collection of landscape views and another, for the best panoramic view of Geelong, at the Geelong Industrial and Juvenile Exhibition in 1879.

In March 1879 Kruger was photographing groups of Geelong residents, ensuring each person could easily be identified in his detailed views, as he did when photographing the Corio Bay rowing crew in November 1879.

Reception 
Kruger's works are held in most national collections including the National Gallery of Australia, the National Library and in the National Gallery of Victoria where successive curators have provide commentary on his imagery. Jennie Boddington in 1980 observed Kruger's capture of significant detail in his scenes,  

while Dr Isobel Crombie, NGV Curator of Photography in 2012 concurred;

Geelong and later life 

Kruger then settled in Geelong permanently, and his photography studio is registered on 29 December 1887 at Skene Street, in the Geelong suburb of Newtown. He created a collection in 1880 of twelve views of the streets and buildings of Geelong, winning him an award at the Melbourne International Exhibition (1880). The government of Victoria engaged him to photograph the Yan Yean Waterworks for the Colonial and Indian Exhibition in London. Kruger gained commissions from house owners to photograph their homes, most famous of which was from Lady Loch, the wife of the Governor.

Kruger made three visits to the Queenscliff region in 1881, 1882 and 1885, capturing views to include the buildings of the settlement and its marine setting.

On 15 February 1888, Kruger died of peritonitis (inflammation of the membranes of abdominal wall and organs). Large holdings of his work have been showcased at the National Gallery of Victoria.

Projects and exhibitions
Kruger's work has been showcased all over the world. One of his most famous pieces of work was the very first group photo of the Aboriginal cricket team, this piece of work was named "Aboriginal Cricketers of Coranderrk", taken in 1866. He had also taken portraits at his studio of the three managers of the Aboriginal cricket team. 

Kruger concentrated on landscape photographs, a comprehensive exhibition of which, Fred Kruger: Intimate Landscapes, was held at the Ian Potter Centre: NGV Australia from 4 February to 8 July 2012, featuring over 100 prints of towns, buildings and streets familiar to present-day Victorians; the Esplanade at Queenscliff, Point Lonsdale and the You Yangs, amongst other locations around Victoria. Kruger's expansive but richly detailed views provide visual data on the social and political standards of Victoria in the mid to late 1800s. This collection of images displays how the Europeans changed the environment in imposing their culture while also preserving a sense of the natural picturesque.

Awards
 1872 Vienna exhibition in Austria: Gold Medal
 1876 Philadelphia Centennial exhibition, Gold Medal
 1879 Geelong Industrial and Juvenile exhibition
 1880 Geelong Industrial and Juvenile exhibition
 1880 Melbourne International exhibition
 1886 Colonial and Indian exhibition

References

Australian photographers
1831 births
1888 deaths
Indigenous rights
German emigrants to Australia
Landscape photographers
Aboriginal Australian health
19th-century Australian photographers